Vadersdorf is a village on the island of Fehmarn in the German state of Schleswig-Holstein.  It is located in the district of East Holstein.  The village occupies an area of 7.2 km².  In 2003, the population of the village was approximately 130.

External links
 The Old Dairy Farm (German)

Villages in Schleswig-Holstein